The Letov Š-13 was a single-seat, single-engine fighter aircraft designed and built in Czechoslovakia in the early 1920s. A biplane, it had aerodynamically thick wings which were originally cantilever structures, though interplane struts were later added. Only one was produced.

Design and development

The Letov Š-13 was designed as a cantilever biplane, its Zhukovsky airfoil wings thick enough in section to allow internal bracing. In other ways it much resembled the 1923 Letov Š-7. The wings, mounted with modest stagger, were straight edged with constant chord and blunt wingtips. The slightly broader chord upper wing was braced to the fuselage with a cabane, formed on each side by a forward parallel pair of struts from the mid-fuselage, and a rear inverted-V pair from the upper fuselage. Only the lower planes carried ailerons.

Both the Š-7 and the Š-13 were powered by a Škoda licence-built Hispano-Suiza 8Fb, a  water-cooled V-8 engine. Letov had experienced cooling problems with it in the Š-7 and so the ring-shaped radiator proposed originally for the Š-13 was dropped and replaced from the start with the transversely mounted, circular cross-section ventral radiator successfully tested on the modified Letov Š-7a. The Hispano drove a two-blade propeller with a domed spinner. Behind the engine, the fuselage had an oval cross-section, with the single open cockpit partially under the wing trailing edge which had a shallow cutout to enhance his view.  The fuselage tapered rearwards to a point behind the tail control surfaces.  The cropped, straight tapered horizontal tail was mounted on the fuselage centreline; the fin and rudder, larger than on the Š-7, were also straight edged.  The Š-7 had a fixed, single-axle conventional undercarriage, with mainwheels on cross-braced V-struts, assisted by a tailskid.

The Letov Š-13 first flew in 1924 in cantilever configuration but during the early flight trials concern about wing strength led to its conversion into a single bay biplane by the addition of a pair of interplane struts.  These were initially N-shaped but later changed to Vs.  The trials demonstrated generally good handling characteristics but stability problems brought an end to development.

Specifications

References

1920s Czechoslovakian fighter aircraft
Letov aircraft
Single-engined tractor aircraft
Biplanes
Aircraft first flown in 1924